Elfriede Hugo is a former East German slalom canoeist who competed in the 1950s. She won three gold medals in the folding K-1 team event at the ICF Canoe Slalom World Championships, earning them in 1955, 1957 and 1959.

References

Possibly living people
East German female canoeists
Year of birth missing (living people)
Medalists at the ICF Canoe Slalom World Championships